Robin L. Webb (born September 6, 1960) is the member of the Kentucky Senate for the 18th District serving since 2009. She formerly served as a member of the Kentucky State Representative for the 96th District from 1999 to 2009, resigning to run for Kentucky Senate. She also has a law office based in Grayson, Kentucky where she lives. She attended Morehead State University and obtained her AAS and BS. She furthered her education at Northern Kentucky University's Chase College of Law, obtaining her J.D. Robin worked as a coal miner until the age of 25. Her father, Dr. Robert Webb, served the people of the Commonwealth for more than three decades as a member of the Kentucky Department of Fish and Wildlife Resources Commission.

References

Kentucky lawyers
Democratic Party Kentucky state senators
Democratic Party members of the Kentucky House of Representatives
Morehead State University alumni
Northern Kentucky University alumni
Women state legislators in Kentucky
Living people
1960 births
People from Grayson, Kentucky
21st-century American politicians
21st-century American women politicians